Air Manchester was a short-lived charter airline based in Manchester, England. The airline only operated for barely three months before it was sold.

History 

Air Manchester started operations during April 1982 with a single BAC One-Eleven Series 416, registration 'G-SURE'. They kept this aircraft through their period of commercial activities, the airline's operations with this aircraft ceased in September 1982 when it was sold to British Air Ferries.

Fleet
The Air Manchester's fleet consisted of the following aircraft:

See also
 List of defunct airlines of the United Kingdom

References
Notes

Bibliography

External links

Defunct charter airlines of the United Kingdom
Airlines established in 1982
Airlines disestablished in 1982
1982 establishments in England
1982 disestablishments in England
1982 mergers and acquisitions